Museum Drohobychchyna (officially known as Drohobych Museum of Local Studies or The Drohobych Museum of Local Lore, commonly called the Drohobych Museum) is a museum in Drohobych, Ukraine, is a major cultural and educational centre of the Lviv Region.

It was founded in 1940 as a Regional History and Local Lore Museum. In the period of the temporary occupation of the town by German fascist invaders its riches were heavily plundered. But already on the fourth day after the literation of the town the fascists - October 9, 1944 - the museum resumed its activity. After the territory of the Drohobych Region was joined with the Lvov Region in May 1959, it proceeded to function as the Regional Museum of Local Studies.

Among the materials of the exhibition there are interesting archeological finds, articles of Drohobych artisans, implements of production and articles of peasants' everyday life; the museum presents numerous documents elucidating different periods in the country's history, printed books published in Ukraine before the 18th century, a collection of the 17th-19th century majolica, works of native and West European fine arts etc. While getting acquainted with St. George and Holy Cross churches, remarkable monuments of wooden folk architecture of Galician school of the late 15th early 16th centuries, the visitor can view specimens of medieval icon-painting, unique wall paintings of the interiors carried out in Renaissance style etc.

Of special value are relics associated with the names of outstanding country-men. Yuriy Kotermack (с. 1450-1494), a Ukrainian scholar, doctor of medicine and philosophy, lecturer and then rector  of the Bologna University, professor of the Cracow University, who was born in Drohobych, is known under the pen-name of Yuriy Drohobych. He is the author of the country's first printed book "Judicium Prognosticon..." (1483). On display are Yu. Drohobych's portrait by I.Marchuk, painter, a photocopy of his astronomic treatise, xerocopy of his lecture schedule in the Bologna University etc.

See also
 St. George's Church, Drohobych
 Church of the Holy Cross, Drohobych

References

Drohobych
Museums established in 1940
Museums in Lviv Oblast